Gregor Urbas (born 20 November 1982 in Jesenice) is a Slovenian former competitive figure skater. He is a three-time Golden Spin of Zagreb champion, a five-time Triglav Trophy champion, the 2006 Ondrej Nepela Memorial champion, and a nine-time (2001–2009) Slovenian national champion. He competed at the 2006 and 2010 Winter Olympics. He qualified for the free skate at nineteen ISU Championships – six Worlds, eight Europeans, and five Junior Worlds.

Urbas began skating when he was about eight years old. His first coach was Mojca Kurbos. He joined Elena Babitskaia and Valeri Babitski by 2001. They coached him until the end of the 2004–05 season. Gordana Smrekar became his coach the following season. During his career, he practiced mainly in Slovenia and occasionally traveled to Philadelphia to train under Uschi Keszler.

Programs

Results 
GP: Grand Prix; JGP: Junior Grand Prix

References

External links

 

Slovenian male single skaters
Olympic figure skaters of Slovenia
Figure skaters at the 2006 Winter Olympics
Figure skaters at the 2010 Winter Olympics
Figure skaters at the 2007 Winter Universiade
1982 births
Living people
Sportspeople from Jesenice, Jesenice